

References

Bibliography
 Crook, Nora. "General Editor's Introduction". Mary Shelley's Literary Lives and Other Writings. Vol. 1. Ed. Tilar J. Mazzeo. London: Pickering & Chatto, 2002. .
 Kucich, Greg. "Mary Shelley's Lives and the Reengendering of History". Mary Shelley in Her Times. Eds. Betty T. Bennett and Stuart Curran. Baltimore: Johns Hopkins University Press, 2000. .
 Kucich, Greg. "Biographer". The Cambridge Companion to Mary Shelley. Ed. Esther Schor. Cambridge: Cambridge University Press, 2003. .
 Peckham, Morse. "Dr. Lardner's Cabinet Cyclopaedia". The Papers of the Bibliographical Society of America 45 (1951): 37–58.

External links
 Fulltext via HathiTrust

Lardner's Cabinet Cyclopædia
1830s books
1840s books
British encyclopedias
19th-century encyclopedias